Val Winter (born 19 July 1943) is an Australian fencer. She competed in the women's team foil event at the 1964 Summer Olympics.

References

1943 births
Living people
Australian female foil fencers
Olympic fencers of Australia
Fencers at the 1964 Summer Olympics
Commonwealth Games medallists in fencing
Commonwealth Games silver medallists for Australia
Fencers at the 1966 British Empire and Commonwealth Games
Medallists at the 1966 British Empire and Commonwealth Games